Martine St. Clair (born Martine Nault, 22 July 1962) is a Canadian singer from the province of Quebec. She has released numerous albums in a career that has spanned over two decades.

St. Clair was born in Montreal.  In 1981, she was chosen by renowned Quebec lyricist Luc Plamondon to play the role of Cristal in the rock-opera Starmania. The following year, she recorded a duet with French singer Gilbert Bécaud called "L'amour est mort".

Her debut solo album in 1983, Coeur Ordinateur, would feature songs written by Plamondon.

She also recorded several duets or collaborated with other recording artists. She recorded the song "Closer Together" with Canadian new wave group The Box in 1986. In 1987, she recorded "Je l'aime" with Nicole Martin and "Tu peux pas" with Claude Dubois. In 1993, she recorded two cover versions of Canadian singer Gino Vannelli's 1979 song "Wheels of Life": one in French as "L'amour Est Loi"; the second in English as a duet with Vannelli himself. Her musicians include guitarist Alexis Charrier, pianist Sonny Lamson.

She received nominations for Female Vocalist of the Year and for Best Selling Single ("L'Amour est dans tes yeux") at the 1986 Juno Awards. The same year she won 4 Felix awards.

Discography

Albums
 1980 Starmania Made in Quebec
 1983 Coeur Ordinateur
 1984 Il y a l'amour dans l'air
 1985 Ce Soir L'amour Est Dans Tes Yeux
 1985 De Starmania À Aujourd'hui (compilation)
 1987 Au Coeur Du Désert
 1987 Mes Plus Belles Chansons (compilation)
 1988 Martine St-Clair
 1988 Starmania 88
 1990 Caribou
 1993 Un Souffle De T'endresse
 1996 Un Long Chemin
 2001 Un Bonheur Fou
 2004 Tout Ce Que J'ai
 2009 Entre vous en moi (Compilation Double CD)

Singles
 1981 "L'amour est mort" (duet with Gilbert Bécaud)
 1982 "Pleure ma petite soeur" (Luc Plamondon-Angelo Finaldi)
 1983 "Le Fils de Superman" (Luc Plamondon-Germain Gauthier)
 1983 "Un Homme Sentimental"(Luc Plamondon-Germain Gauthier)
 1984 "Il y a de l'amour dans l'air" (Claude-Michel Schonberg)
 1984 "Ohé Ohé" (duet with Normand Brathwaite)
 1985 "On va s'aimer" (Didier Barbelivien - Gilbert Montagné)
 1985 "Simplement"
 1985 "Je l'aime" (duet with Nicole Martin)
 1986 "Ce soir l'amour est dans tes yeux" (Claude-Michel Schonberg)
 1986 "Dis-moi de revenir"
 1986 "Heureuse sans être amoureuse"
 1986 "Plus près des étoiles"
 1986 "Quand je tombe en amour"
 1988 "Au coeur du désert"
 1988 "Danse avec moi"
 1988 "Monte, monte" (Martine St-Clair-J.-V.Fournier-Jean-Alain Roussel)
 1989 "Folle de vous" (Claude-Michel Schonberg)
 1989 "Tous les juke-box" (Luc Plamondon-René Grignon)
 1990 "Désir égale danger" (Luc Plamondon-Franck Langolf)
 1990 "Lavez Lavez" ( P.Grillet/M.Lavoine-P.Stive/F. Aboulker)
 1990 "Je ne sais plus comment j'm'appelle" (P.Grillet/M.Lavoine-P.Stive/F. Aboulker)
 1991 "Je veux vous embrasser"
 1991 "Seulement pour toujours"
 1993 "L'Amour Est Loi" (duet with Gino Vannelli)
 1996 "Un Long Chemin"
 1996 "Usure Des Jours"
 2001 "Un jour"
 2002 "Débranche"
 2005 "Rien dans les mains"
 2005 "Stay"
 2005 "Amoureux fou"
 2006 "Mon amour, mon ami"
 2006 "Djé Oné Bwaba (Lavez Lavez 2006)"
 2009 "Qui pourrait t'aimer mieux que moi"

References

External links
 Martine St. Clair Official Web site, accessed 2007-06-12
 Martine St. Clair  Very detailed unofficial web site , accessed 2007-06-12
 QuebecPop (Artists: S), accessed 2006-09-30
 Québec Info Musique, accessed 2006-09-30

1962 births
French Quebecers
Living people
Singers from Montreal
French-language singers of Canada
Canadian musical theatre actresses
Canadian women pop singers
20th-century Canadian women singers
21st-century Canadian women singers